Juju Street Songs is an album by saxophonist Gary Bartz's NTU Troop recorded in 1972 and released on the Prestige label.

Reception

Allmusic awarded the album 4 stars saying "Excellent from start to finish, this LP captures Bartz at the height of his creativity".

Track listing 
All compositions by Gary Bartz except as indicated
 "I Wanna Be Where You Are" (Arthur Ross, Leon Ware) - 10:04
 "Black Maybe" (Stevie Wonder) - 9:32 		
 "Bertha Baptist" (Stafford James) - 6:32 		
 "Africans Unite" - 6:28 		
 "Teheran" - 8:20

Personnel 
Gary Bartz - alto saxophone, soprano saxophone, sopranino saxophone, voice, electric piano, percussion
Andy Bey - vocals, electric piano, percussion
Stafford James - bass, electric bass, voice, percussion
Howard King - drums, voice, percussion

References 

Gary Bartz albums
1972 albums
Prestige Records albums